"Step It Out Mary" (also "Step It Out Mary My Fine Daughter") is a traditional Irish ballad.  In 1999, The Companion to Irish Traditional Music credited Sean McCarthy with penning the song.

Publications

 Jones, Tom (1967). "Step It Out Mary". Major.

References

Irish ballads